Wasij was a village near Farab in Kazakhstan and the birthplace of the Central Asian scientist Al-Farabi.

References

Populated places in Kazakhstan